Argentina Fans Kaattoorkadavu is a 2019 Indian Malayalam-language comedy-drama film directed by Midhun Manuel Thomas, starring Kalidas Jayaram and Aishwarya Lekshmi in leading roles. The film is written by Ashokan Cheruvil, John Manthrickal and Midhun Manuel Thomas. The film's musical score was composed by Gopi Sunder. It was released on 22 March 2019. This movie was a box-office disaster.

Synopsis 
The movie revolves around the story of Vipinan and his love for football and his lady love Mehru.

Cast 

 Kalidas Jayaram as Vipinan
 Aishwarya Lekshmi as Mehrunnisa Khatherkutty
 Anu K Aniyan as Najeeb Pambadan
 Austin Dan as Andrés Escobar
 Aneesh Gopal as Sunimon Arattukkuzhi
 Syam Cargoz as Ajayaghosh
 Paul Joseph as Raghavan
 Zhinz Shan as Thomas Mash
 Adv. P. Manikandan as Khatherkutty
 Arjun Ratan as Sejeer
 Sonia Giri as Suja
 Assim Jamal as Munir Koduvally
 Karthika Menon as Aryambika
 Aroop Sivdas as Vinod Aikkarakund
 Neeraj Karepparambil as Alex Palliveedan
 Arunamshu Dev as Vipinan's childhood

Soundtrack

Release 
The trailer of the film was released on 13 February 2019. The film was set to be released on 1 March 2019 but was later postponed to 22 March 2019.

References

External links 
 

2019 films
2010s Malayalam-language films
Films set in the United Arab Emirates
Films shot in Thrissur
Films directed by Midhun Manuel Thomas
Indian association football films
Indian sports comedy-drama films
2010s sports comedy-drama films
Indian romantic comedy-drama films
2019 romantic comedy-drama films